The 2019 Judo Grand Prix Marrakesh was held in Marrakesh, Morocco, from 8 to 10 March 2019.

Medal summary

Men's events
Source:

Women's events
Source:

Medal table

References

External links
 

2019 IJF World Tour
2019 Judo Grand Prix
21st century in Marrakesh
Sports competitions in Marrakesh
2019 in Moroccan sport